Darryl Cronje (born 4 August 1967) is a South African swimmer. He competed in three events at the 1992 Summer Olympics.

References

External links
 

1967 births
Living people
South African male swimmers
Olympic swimmers of South Africa
Swimmers at the 1992 Summer Olympics
Sportspeople from Durban